The Treaty of Saigon (referring to the year of "Yang Water Dog" in the sexagenary cycle) was signed on 5 June 1862 between representatives of the French Empire and the last precolonial emperor of the House of Nguyen, Emperor Tự Đức. Based on the terms of the accord, Tự Đức ceded Saigon, the island of Poulo Condor and three southern provinces of what was to become known as Cochinchina (Bien Hoa, Gia Dinh, and Dinh Tuong) to the French. The treaty was confirmed by the Treaty of Hué signed on 14 April 1863.

See also
Western imperialism in Asia

References 
Saigon, Treaty of, Encyclopædia Britannica 2006, Encyclopædia Britannica Premium Service. 30 March 2006

The Encyclopedia of the Nations – Country Data – Vietnam
C'est arrivé un jour – 5 Juin

1862 in Vietnam
1862 in France
19th century in Vietnam
Saigon
Treaties of the Second French Empire
Treaties of the Nguyen dynasty
France–Vietnam relations
1862 in the French colonial empire
Saigon